Tigerville is an unincorporated community in St. John the Baptist Parish, in the U.S. state of Louisiana.

Etymology
According to tradition, Tigerville was so named when early settlers mistook native cougars for tigers.

References

Unincorporated communities in St. John the Baptist Parish, Louisiana
Unincorporated communities in Louisiana